Greece sent competitors to the 2018 Winter Paralympics in Pyeongchang, South Korea. One person represented Greece with snowboarder Konstantinos Petrakis. It is the first time a snowboarder has represented Greece at the Winter Paralympics. Greece first went to the Winter Paralympics in 2002. The 2018 Games are the fifth time they sent a team to the Winter Paralympics.

Team 

Greece is going to have a team that includes one snowboarder, Konstantinos Petrakis.  It is the first time a snowboarder has represented Greece at the Winter Paralympics.

The table below contains the list of members of people (called "Team Greece") that will be participating in the 2018 Games.

History 
Greece first went to the Winter Paralympics in 2002.  The 2018 Games are the fifth time they sent a team to the Winter Paralympics.

Para-snowboarding

Snowboarders 
Konstantinos Petrakis is from Veria. Petrakis is only racing in the snowboard cross.  He has won five medals in his career in the event.

Schedule and results 
The snowboard cross event starts on 12 March.  It goes from 10:30 AM to 5:00 PM for all classes for both men and women.

References 

2018
Nations at the 2018 Winter Paralympics
2018 in Greek sport